Yashoda Wimaladharma (Sinhala: යශෝධා විමලධර්ම) is a Sri Lankan actress in Sri Lankan cinema, stage drama and television. Often referred to as the "innocent on the small screen", Wimaladharma excelled in cinema, television and theatre in a career spanning more than three decades. Through her experience in domestic and foreign cinema, she is also working as a jury member of foreign cinema festivals.

Biography
Yashoda Wimaladharma was born on 28 October 1970 in Sri Lanka to Ravilal Wimaladharma, a Hindi language lecturer at University of Kelaniya and Mallika Wimaladharma, a former dancer and school teacher. Her sister Thusitha, now a school teacher, is seven years older than Yashoda. She has a master's degree in Hindi and fluent in the language.

Wimaladharma attended St. Paul’s Girls School, Milagiriya in Colombo.

Career 
She was invited to act in the teledrama Atta Bindei in 1988 directed by her uncle Bandula Vithanage. This marks the beginning of her drama career.
Yashoda made her cinema debut in 1990 from the film titled Gurugedara (Teacher's home) directed by Vijaya Dharmasiri, and also won the merit award for this film at Sarasaviya Film Festival in 1993.

Yashoda hosted her personal website (www.yashodaw.com) on 18 June 2003 the ceremony was held at Galadari Hotel, Colombo. This was the first-ever website hosted by a Sri Lankan actress. In 1999, she made her first song lyrics titled Thugu Girikulu. The song was sung by Dayan Witharana and the music was composed by Rohana Weerasinghe.

In 2019, she became the first Sri Lanka to appointed as a judge in international film festival.

Television acting

 Bonikko
 Damini
 Doowaru
 Hiru Kumari
 Isuru Sangramaya
 Kada Thira
 Kutu Kutu Mama
 Minissu
 Nenala<ref>{{cite web |url=http://www.sarasaviya.lk/teledramas/2020/09/24/19033/නාලන්ගේ-නෑනලා-රූපවාහිනියට-එති |title=Nalan's 'Nenala come on TV |publisher=Sarasaviya |access-date=24 September 2017}}</ref>
 Paaradeesaya Raahu Rajina Samudra Chaya Sanda Nati Reya Satharadenek Senpathiyo Sathmahala Sathpura Wasiyo See Raja Senehewanthayo Sooriya Daruwo Suwanda Padma Thawa Durai Jeewithe Thanamalvila Kollek Uthpala Wasana Wewa Vasanthaya Avilla Vihanga Geethaya''

Filmography

References

External links 

Personal Website
යශෝධා විමලධර්මගෙන් කාන්තා පරපුරට අගනා දායාදයක්
පාර ක්ලියර් -නිවැරදිව යමු තණමල්විල කොල්ලෙක් ගැන යශෝධා සමඟ කතාවක්

Living people
Sri Lankan film actresses
1970 births
Sri Lankan television actresses
Sinhalese actresses
20th-century Sri Lankan actresses
21st-century Sri Lankan actresses
Actresses in Malayalam cinema